Antonio Ravelo (2 April 1940 – 15 February 2014) was a Venezuelan footballer. He played in seven matches for the Venezuela national football team from 1967 to 1969. He was also part of Venezuela's squad for the 1967 South American Championship.

References

1940 births
2014 deaths
Venezuelan footballers
Venezuela international footballers
Place of birth missing
Association football defenders